Chernomorets is a Bulgarian football club based in Balchik, that competes in the North-East Third League, the third tier of Bulgarian football. The team plays its home games at the local Balchik Stadium with 3,200 seats.

History

Chernomorets were founded as Sport Club Strela in late 1918 by English and Italian soldiers after World War I. The team finally became known as Chernomorets in 1957.

In its history, Chernomorets has played mainly in the Bulgarian amateurs divisions. Until the 1976/77 season, the team participated at most in the third Bulgarian division, but gained a promotion to the B Group for the 1977/78 season. The next season was not so successful and the team was relegated back to the third division (The club finishing in 17th place in the group).

Chernomorets qualified for the second time in its history for the second division by finishing in 3rd place in North-Eastern V Group in the 2007-08 season. In this period, in the club worked as an assistant coach former famous football player Iliyan Kiryakov.

Chernomorets withdrew from B PFG in February 2011 due to suffering from finance debts.

Between 9 November 2014 and 27 March 2016, Chernomorets won 37 consecutive games in the third division. The club sent a letter to the Guinness Book of World Records as a jest for its achievement. In the 2015–16 season, the team finished first and won promotion to the B Group after five years of absence, but on 12 June 2016, they announced that will stay in V Group and won't compete in the professional tier due to financial reasons.

Honours
Second League
 7th place: 2018–19
Third League
  Winners (2): 2015–16, 2016–17
Bulgarian Cup
Round of 16 (2): 2018–19, 2020–21
Cup of Bulgarian Amateur Football League
  Winners (1): 2016–17
  Runners-up (1): 2015–16

Players

Current squad
As of 1 August 2020

Past seasons

League positions

References

External links 
 Chernomorets Balchik at bgclubs.eu

Association football clubs established in 1918
Football clubs in Bulgaria
1918 establishments in Bulgaria
Balchik